This is a list of British film production designers

A
 Ken Adam

B
 John Barry
 John Box

C
 Maurice Carter
 Martin Childs
 Stuart Craig

D
 Carmen Dillon
 Guy Hendrix Dyas

F
 Anton Furst

G
 Assheton Gorton

H
 Tim Harvey

L
 Peter Lamont

M
 Terence Marsh
 Anthony Masters
 Thomas N. Morahan

P
 Anthony Pratt

R
 Norman Reynolds
 Chris Richmond

S
 Elliot Scott

V
 Alex Vetchinsky

Film designers
Designers